Urgency is the debut album from the Canadian alternative rock band Low Level Flight, released on March 27, 2007. The album spawned three singles: "Change for Me", "Say" and "Turnaround".

Singles
"Change for Me" - Released on March 6, 2007 as the first single, the song peaked at number 69 on the Canadian Hot 100 chart.
"Say" - Released in November 2007, the song was a radio hit and peaked at number 22 on the Canadian Hot 100 chart, becoming the band's first single to chart within the Top 30. The song remains the band's most successful song to date.
"Turnaround" - Released on June 17, 2008 as the third and final single, the song failed to chart.

Critical reception

The album received a "Very Poor" rating from Sputnikmusic. In describing the album, staff reviewer Tyler Munro writes, "[I]n the end it just comes off as worship and tribute to virtually every sound currently found on the radio."

Track listing

Personnel
Adapted from the Urgency media notes.

Ryan Malcolm: lead vocals, acoustic guitar
Shaun Noronha: bass guitar, backing vocals
Dave Carter: lead guitar
James Rooke: rhythm guitar
Brandon Merenick: drums, percussion
Ray Coburn: Piano on the tracks "When Will I Learn" and "All That I Need"
Mike Borkosky: Producer, recording and mix engineer, additional guitars, keys, percussion, and programming
Michael Rosenberg: Management
Patrick Duffy: Art direction & Design
Caitlin Cronenberg: Photography

References

2007 debut albums